For Al-Salawi, the author of al-Istiqsa see Ahmad ibn Khalid al-Nasiri

Ahmad ibn Mohammed ibn Nasir al-Salawi (1791 in Sale – 1840 in Sudan) was a Maliki scholar, Sufi teacher and writer, who played an important role in Sudan during the reign of the colonial Turkish-Egyptian administration. Al-Salawi was closely connected with Sudanese scholars like Ahmad ibn Isa al-Ansari, Ahmad al-Tayyib w. al-Bashir (whose daughter he married) and Ismail ibn Abd Allah al-Wali.

Works
Al-Salawi wrote the following books:
 al-Dhayl., Publ.  Tabaqat Wad Dayf Allah, al-dhayl wa’l-takmila, ed. Muhammad  Ibrahım  Abü  Salım &  Yüsuf Fadl H˘asan, Khartoum 1982.
  al-Durr al-manzum fı asanıdina fı sa'ir al-'ulum.
  Ishraq masabih al-tanwır fı sharh Mawlid al-bashır al-nadhır, MS: al-Maktaba al-baladiyya, Alexandria, majmüfia,  alif 139.
 Ithaf ahl al-sidq, MS: Yale, L-9, 367ff., 1842,
  al-Jawhar al-maknun  wa’l-sirr al-masun alladhı tataqarrab ilayhi al-fiuyun
  al-Minah al-samadiyya fı ikhtisar al-Hadıqa al-nadiyya fı shar al-Tarıqa al-Muhammadiyya wa’l-sıra al-Ahmad-iyya, MS: Cairo, Dar al-kutub, tasawwuf, 171.
  Risala (Untitled  and undated. A  brief  work in commendation of Ismaıl b. Abd Allah al-Walı and his tarıqa.) MS: National Records Office, Khartoum, Misc., Ismaıliyya 2, 292-300.
 Sharh ala aqıdat al-Risala fı ’l-basmala wa’l-hamdala
 Sharh ala ’l-Arba'ın al-Nawawiyya
 Sharh ala  ’l-Ibtihaj bi’l-kalam [or fı ’l-kalam] ala ’l-isra wa’l-mi raj, MS: al-Maktaba al-baladiyya, Alexandria,  majmüfia  alif, 139.
 Tazım al-ittifaq fı ayat al-mıthaq

References

1840 deaths
1791 births
Moroccan writers
Moroccan Sufis
Moroccan scholars
People from Salé
18th-century Moroccan people
19th-century Moroccan people